Brenda Asnicar (born 17 October 1991) is an Argentine actress, singer, model and dancer who gained international popularity for her debut role as Antonella Lamas Bernardi in the Disney Channel television series Patito feo.

Life and career

1991–2009: Early life and career beginnings 
Asnicar was born in Buenos Aires, Argentina, the daughter of Gustavo Asnicar and Adriana Mendoza. Asnicar has stated that she is also of Venezuelan, Italian and Slovenian ancestry. She has one brother, Iván, and her religion is Roman Catholicism. During her childhood Brenda studied at the Italian Cultural Centre school in Villa Adelina, where she learned to speak fluent Italian.

Asnícar made her television debut on the children's program Cantaniño in 1999, when she was 8 years old. In 2003 at age 12 she began working on the TV show Chicos Argentinos.

Asnícar debuted as a singer on albums for Cataniño and Chicos Argentinos. These albums were a commercial success in Argentina and numerous other countries, most notably Italy.

2007–2009: Patito Feo 
In 2007, Asnícar landed her first leading role on television, as Antonella Lamas in Patito feo (Ugly Duckling), also created by Marcelo Tinelli and produced by Ideas del Sur. It became one of the most popular adolescent television programs in Latin America, Europe and Asia. The series aired on Disney Channel between July 2007 and March 2011, becoming a global phenomenon.

Patito feo released five studio albums, of which four were certified platinum and one was certified gold by the Argentine Chamber of Phonograms and Videograms Producers. Patito feo won a Premios Carlos Gardel and three nominations for Carlos Gardel Awards.

2009–2016: Breakthrough with Sueña conmigo 
From 2009 to 2011, Asnícar starred in the series Sueña conmigo. The series earned high ratings and was a huge success in Latin America, Spain, and Italy. In 2011, the cast toured Argentina, Latin America, and Italy, performing songs from the series.

In 2011 she starred in the series Los únicos with María Eugenia Suárez and Nicolás Cabré in El Trece and under production of Pol-ka.

Since January 2012, Asnicar had starred the Telemundo series Corazón valiente (Fearless Heart), along with Adriana Fonseca, Ximena Duque, José Luis Reséndez and Fabián Ríos, as Fabiola Arroyo, one of its leading characters.

In 2016, Asnicar previewed The B Collection with mcma London; the collection launched on February 10, 2016.

From 2013 2015, Asnícar landed the role of Juana Carbajal series Cumbia Ninja, which achieved international success. She also became a member of successful music group Cumbia Ninja in the series, along with Ricardo Abarca.

In 2016, Asnicar starred on Por amarte así, a new television series by Claudio Lacelli, opposite Gastón Soffritti, Catherine Fulop and Facundo Gambandé.

Personal life 

In 2011 she was in a relationship with Argentine footballer Carlos Tevez, who previously played for Club Atlético Boca Juniors and is a retired player of the Argentina national team.

Filmography

Television

Discography

Studio albums 
 2019: Vos Sos Dios

References

External links 
 
 

1991 births
Living people
Argentine film actresses
Argentine telenovela actresses
Argentine television actresses
People from San Isidro, Buenos Aires
Argentine child singers
21st-century Argentine women singers
21st-century Argentine actresses
Argentine people of Venezuelan descent
Argentine people of Italian descent
Argentine people of Slovenian descent
Argentine Roman Catholics